Dr Norman Kingwell Day (born 25 March 1947, in Melbourne, Australia) is an architect, educator, and writer.

Architecture

After graduating, in the late 60s Norman Day worked in the office of Romberg & Boyd, with noted architect and critic Robin Boyd and Professor Frederick Romberg. He then started his own practice in 1971. 

His practice was initially based in Melbourne, where he came to prominence in the 1980s as part of the new wave of architects who adopted Postmodernism.  

Later his practice expended to South East Asia, with offices in Melbourne, Ho Chi Minh City, Bangkok and Dili.

His architecture is contemporary and investigative, it seeks to provide long-life-term constructions which last over time rather than short-term solutions which satisfy a culture of ‘architecture as a commodity’. 

His major commissions include Mowbray College (Melton), Australian and New Zealand College of Anaesthetists Headquarters (Melbourne), RMIT International University, Vietnam (Ho Chi Minh City) and Can Tho University Learning Resource Center (Can Tho City, Vietnam) and the Embassy for East Timor (Canberra). 

Since 2000, he has been involved with the new nation of East Timor,  consulting on the reconstruction of the country with projects including the Xanana Gusmão Reading Room/ Library (Dili), Hotel dom Aleixo (Dili)and schemes for empowerment training. He is a board member of "Architects Without Frontiers". Design submissions have been made for a design proposal for the new Assembly and Ba Dinh Hall (Hanoi), an urban design competition for Thu Thiem district (HCMC), Australian Centre for Contemporary Art (Melbourne), MOMA at Heide (Melbourne), West Kowloon Redevelopment (Hong Kong) and National Trade Union Headquarters (Singapore).

Teaching 

He is an Adjunct Professor of Architecture at the RMIT University, which also awarded him an honorary Doctorate of Architecture. During the period 1976 to 2002 he was Lecturer and Design Coordinator Theory, History, Communications Department of Architecture, Faculty of Design and Environmental Construction,  RMIT University (Melbourne). He has lectured also at the University of Western Australia Perth, School of Art and Design, RMIT at Bundoora, University of New South Wales (Sydney), School of Architecture, University of Melbourne. Department of Architecture (with Professor Susana Torre), Columbia University, New York, Lecturer Council of Adult Education, Monash University (Melbourne),Swinburne Technical College (Melbourne), and Deakin University (Geelong).

Day's titles are: Doctor of Architecture (Honoris Causa, RMIT), Adjunct Professor of Architecture (RMIT), M Arch (RMIT), B Arch (Melb), ARB (Vic),

Exhibitions
XXX Exhibition, 30 Years of Architecture – Norman Day, RMIT Gallery, Melbourne. 2001
Models Inc. Architects + Industry (Curator: Val Austin) A + I Gallery, Melbourne. 1996
World - Wide -  Work : Architecture by Fax CURVE, Tolarno Gallery, Melbourne. 1995
"Fin de Siecle? : and the Sydney twenty - first century: Architectures of Melbourne", Clapin Burdett Gallery. Sydney. 1993
" Fin de Siecle ? Melbourne - and the twenty-first century " RMIT. Melbourne. 1992	
Australian Mythos Sydney - Reflection on an Unfinished Journey. 1988
Neo-Classicism ? Monash University + Power Institute (Sydney and Melbourne).1986
Two x Two '86: Artists + Architects: George Paton Gallery (Melbourne).1986 (Exhibition partner Julie Brown-Rrap )
Architecture as Idea, RMIT Gallery, Melbourne. 1984
Next Wave, Canberra. 1981
Four Melbourne Architects , Powell Street Gallery, Melbourne, with Edmond Corrigan, Greg Burgess , Peter Crone 1979

Awards and honours

Professional awards include:
RAIA-Bates Smart Award for Architecture in the Media.
Finalist Award Robin Boyd Award House of the Year
RAIA (National) : For Outstanding Architecture.
Seven Royal Australian Institute of Architects Awards. 
Lustig + Moar - RAIA Architecture Prize.
BELLE magazine "House of the Year" 1990.
Housing Industry of Australia, House of the Year Award (Best Use of Steel).
The Australian Business award 2005 for "Business Innovation", Australian Chamber of Commerce (AUSCHAM) – Fosters Vietnam Ltd.
Excellence in Construction - National Building and Construction Awards,Commercial Building, National Award Master Builders Association of Australia.
Excellence in Construction - Commercial Building
Victorian State Award Master Builders Association of Victoria.
Australian Government Award for valued contribution as a volunteer working in East Timor (Timor Leste).
City of Port Phillip Design + Development Awards (Australian and New Zealand College of Anaesthetists) – best contribution to achieving sustainable development.

Writing
He was first employed as architecture critic for The Age (Melbourne) in 1976, and has supplied critique for the Australian Broadcasting Commission (Radio and TV), and previously for the Sydney Morning Herald and The Sunday Age (Melbourne).

Articles have been published world-wide including - National Times (Melbourne), (Editor) Architecture Australia magazine (National), (Editor) Architect Magazine, DOMUS (Italy), Studio International (London), International Architecture (London), Aujourd Hui (Paris), Monument Magazine (Sydney), Transition Magazine (Melbourne), Australian Art Review (Sydney), Express Magazine (New York), Meanjin (Melbourne) and Melbourne University Magazine (Melbourne).

Publications include
 Federation Square, (Hardie Grant Books, 2003)
 Notes From The Laboratory (in prep.)
 Heroic Melbourne - Architecture of the 1950s (RMIT,1995)
Fin de Siecle? - and the twenty-first century, part author (RMIT, 1992)
Modern Houses: Melbourne (Zouch), 1976.
 Bell, The life and work of Guilford Bell, Architect 1912-1992, A Bookman Transition Publication, Melbourne, 1999. part author -(van Schaik, Leon, Ed.).
 AARDVARK 3 : A Selected Guide to Contemporary Melbourne Architects,- introductory essay - (also CD ROM and Internet),(Evans, Doug,Ed.) The Department of Architecture, RMIT, Melbourne, 1997.
 Puckapunyal Armoured Centre - Hopkins Barracks
 Department of Housing and Construction Melbourne. 1985.

Notes

References
Monash Biographical Dictionary of 20th Century Australia, Reed Reference Publishing 1994
Essay Melbourne Architecture - Aardvark
Biography - Aardvark
RRR Podcast

External links
 Norman Day + Associates
 The Age
 RMIT University
 RMIT International University Vietnam
 Can Tho University LRC
 Architects Without Frontiers

Architects from Melbourne
RMIT University alumni
Academic staff of RMIT University
Living people
1947 births
20th-century Australian architects
Postmodern architects
Architecture critics